Haffenreffer is a German surname.  It may apply to:

Organizations
 Haffenreffer Brewery, a former brewer in Jamaica Plain, Massachusettses, established in 1870
 Haffenreffer Museum of Anthropology, a teaching and research museum at Brown University
 Narragansett Brewing Company, a Rhode Island brewer that acquired Heffenreffer Brewing in 1965

People
 Rudolf F. Haffenreffer, a Rhode Island industrialist and philanthropist